Kallithea (before 1928: Ρούδαρι – Roudari) is a village in the Florina Regional Unit in West Macedonia, Greece.

Demographics 
In the early 1900s, 270 Slavonic speaking Christians lived in the village. After the Greek Civil War, only 10 Macedonian speaking families remained and the abandoned houses of those that fled were settled by Aromanians. They were from a group of nomadic transhumant Aromanians known as the Arvanitovlachs, and  the Greek government assisted them to settle in depopulated villages of the Prespa region like Kallithea during the 1950s. The Aromanians originated from Giannitsa and the region of Epirus.

Kallithea had 170 inhabitants in 1981. In fieldwork done by Riki Van Boeschoten in late 1993, Kallithea was populated by Aromanians and Slavophones.

References

External links
Prespes website

Populated places in Florina (regional unit)